Elijah Hadyn "Lige" Clarke (February 22, 1942 − February 10, 1975) was an American LGBT activist, journalist and author. He was the author of two books with his lover, Jack Nichols.

Early life
Clarke was born on February 22, 1942, in Cave Branch, an unincorporated community in Knott County, Kentucky, just outside of the town of Hindman, where he grew up and attended school. Clarke was a graduate of Eastern Kentucky University and later left Kentucky and joined the United States Army.

Career
By the early 1960s, Clarke worked for the United States Department of Defense in Washington, D.C. He held "a host of security clearances."

Clarke and Nichols created and wrote "The Homosexual Citizen" as a continuation to their original column written for The Mattachine Review beginning around 1965. It was published in Screw magazine. It was the first regular LGBT-interest column printed in a non-LGBT publication. By 1972, they edited Gay, the first weekly national homosexual magazine.

Clarke and Nichols authored two books about same-sex attraction.

Personal life and death
Clarke met Jack Nichols in the early 1960s in Washington, D.C. They became lovers.

On February 10, 1975, Clarke was shot and killed near Veracruz, Mexico while traveling with a friend, Charlie Black. The two men were pursued while driving by four men on two motorcycles before being shot; Clarke was shot through the chest multiple times by gunfire, while Black was only wounded.

Clarke is buried in Hindman, Kentucky.

Selected works

References

Coleman, Jonathan. "'Old Kentucky Homo': Lige Clarke's Gay Liberation." The Register of the Kentucky Historical Society, Vol. 118, No. 1 (Winter 2020). https://muse.jhu.edu/article/772266

Further reading
 Bullough, Vern L. (2002). Before Stonewall: Activists for Gay and Lesbian Rights in Historical Context. Routledge. .
 Coleman, Jonathan. "'Old Kentucky Homo': Lige Clarke's Gay Liberation." The Register of the Kentucky Historical Society, Vol. 118, No. 1 (Winter 2020). https://muse.jhu.edu/article/772266

External links
 Lige Clarke : body and soul

1942 births
1975 deaths
People from Chevy Chase, Maryland
American people murdered abroad
Deaths by firearm in Mexico
American LGBT writers
American LGBT rights activists
American LGBT journalists
People murdered in Mexico
20th-century American non-fiction writers
LGBT people from Kentucky
People from Knott County, Kentucky
Eastern Kentucky University alumni
20th-century American LGBT people